The 2020 United States presidential election in Nevada was held on Tuesday, November 3, 2020, as part of the 2020 United States presidential election in which all 50 states plus the District of Columbia participated. Nevada voters chose electors to represent them in the Electoral College via a popular vote, pitting the Republican Party's nominee, incumbent President Donald Trump, and running mate Vice President Mike Pence against Democratic Party nominee, former Vice President Joe Biden, and his running mate California Senator Kamala Harris. Nevada has six votes in the Electoral College.

Throughout the campaign, polls of the state generally showed a Biden lead, albeit with a sometimes slender margin. Prior to polling day, most news organizations considered that Nevada was leaning towards Biden.

Trump became the second ever Republican incumbent to consecutively lose Nevada after William McKinley and only the fourth Republican to have ever held office without winning the state in an election.

Biden carried Nevada by 2.39%, a slightly smaller margin than Hillary Clinton's 2.42% in 2016, making it one of just seven states in which Trump improved on his 2016 margin. Biden's somewhat narrow victory in Nevada also makes it his weakest victory in a state that Hillary Clinton had won in 2016, as well as the only one that was decided by less than a 7.1% margin of victory. Most counties in the state of Nevada are rural, and voted heavily for Trump. However, Biden won the two most populous counties, Clark and Washoe, which make up almost 89% of Nevada's population and are decisive in deciding the winner of the state.  Biden also won Washoe County by a wider margin than Clinton. The state's three largest cities are also located in these counties: Las Vegas and Henderson in the former, and Reno in the latter. His strength in these areas was likely due to high presence of minority and union voters: Biden's strength came from heavy turnout among culinary unions in populous Clark County, anchored by Las Vegas. Biden had the backing of Culinary Union Local 226, based on right-to-work standards. Additionally, Biden was able to win about 43% and 34% of votes in the tourism-heavy Lake Tahoe areas of Carson City and Douglas County respectively, sealing his victory in the state.

Nevada weighed in for this election as 2% more Republican than the nation-at-large.

Caucuses

Canceled Republican caucuses

On September 7, 2019, the Nevada Republican Party became one of several state GOP parties to officially cancel their respective primaries and caucuses. Donald Trump's re-election campaign and GOP officials have cited the fact that Republicans canceled several state primaries when George H. W. Bush and George W. Bush sought a second term in 1992 and 2004, respectively; and Democrats scrapped some of their primaries when Bill Clinton and Barack Obama were seeking reelection in 1996 and 2012, respectively. In August 2019, the Associated Press quoted the state party spokesman, Keith Schipper, who stated it "isn't about any kind of conspiracy theory about protecting the president... He's going to be the nominee... This is about protecting resources to make sure that the president wins in Nevada and that Republicans up and down the ballot win in 2020."

In lieu of conducting their caucuses, the state party's governing central committee instead formally held an Alternative Presidential Preference Poll on February 22, 2020, voting by acclamation to officially bind all 25 of its national pledged delegates to Trump.

Democratic caucuses

General election

Final predictions

Polling

Graphical summary

Aggregate polls

Polls

Donald Trump vs. Bernie Sanders

Donald Trump vs. Elizabeth Warren

Donald Trump vs. Pete Buttigieg

Donald Trump vs. Cory Booker

Donald Trump vs. Marianne Williamson

Donald Trump vs. Kamala Harris

Donald Trump vs Generic Democrat vs Howard Schultz

Results

By county

By congressional district 
Biden won 3 of the state's 4 congressional districts.

Analysis
Given the outcome of the election in other states, Nevada became a crucial swing state to determine whether Joe Biden or Donald Trump would win the 2020 presidential election. With Biden's win, this would mark the fourth presidential election in a row that Nevada has voted Democratic, although this is the first time since the beginning of the Democratic winning streak in Nevada that the state was more Republican than the nation, the last time being 2004, when incumbent George W. Bush carried the state by 2.6% and won the national popular vote by 2.4%. Nevada was the state that came closest to flipping from blue to red in 2020.

The COVID-19 pandemic in particular had a strong effect on Nevada, as the pandemic negatively affected gambling and tourism, which the state's economy relies on. 22% of voters regarded the pandemic as the most important issue of the election, and these voters broke for Biden by 73 points.

Most counties in the state of Nevada are rural, and have voted Republican since 1980. As a whole, the rural counties outside of Las Vegas and Reno made up much of Trump's total. The state's two most populous counties, Clark County and Washoe County, which contain over 89% of the state's population, broke for Biden. Outside of Clark and Reno, Biden's strongest performances would be in the Lake Tahoe areas of Carson City and Douglas County; while these areas are more rural and Republican-leaning, they are also reliant on both the gambling and tourism industries. Biden hit nearly 43% in Carson City, and received 33% of the vote in Douglas County—this totaled to more than 24,000 votes, effectively clinching the state for Biden.

Nevada received facetious attention because of the delay in its finalization of results compared to most other battleground states. 3 days before the state was called, the electoral map showed Biden at 264 electoral votes while having a narrow lead in Nevada, with Trump having a lead in the remaining uncalled swing states. Had the state been called for Biden sooner, its 6 electors would've increased his electoral vote count exactly to the required 270 to win the presidency. The delay in Nevada's results became an internet meme before the state was projected for Biden on November 7.

Latino voters 
Latinos were critical to Biden's victory in Nevada, particularly Latinos of Mexican heritage. Latino membership in the Culinary Workers Union was a key driver of Democratic dominance in the state, with over 60,000 (mostly Latino) members who work in the Las Vegas casino, hotel, and service industries, as well as other tourism industries.

Voter demographics

Aftermath

On November 5, the Nevada Republican Party alleged "at least 3,062 instances of voter fraud". Republican lawyers released a list of over 3,000 people who allegedly did not live in Clark County, Nevada, when they voted. However, these were not proven to be illegal votes, because Nevada (a) allows for people who moved states 30 days before the election to vote in Nevada's election, and (b) allows people studying in colleges in another state to vote in Nevada's election. Additionally, the list featured military members who were overseas and voted by mail.

On November 17, representatives of the Trump campaign asked a judge to nullify Biden's 33,596-vote margin, and simply declare Trump the winner and his electors elected. However, on November 24, the Nevada Supreme Court certified Biden as the winner of the state.

See also
 United States presidential elections in Nevada
 2020 Nevada elections
 2020 United States presidential election
 2020 Democratic Party presidential primaries
 2020 Republican Party presidential primaries
 2020 United States elections

Notes

Partisan clients

References

Further reading

External links
 
 
  (State affiliate of the U.S. League of Women Voters)
 

Nevada
2020
United States presidential